Olive Christelle Ngo Nyepel (born 16 January 1995), known as Christelle Nyepel, is a footballer who plays as a midfielder. Born and raised in Cameroon, she is a naturalized citizen of Equatorial Guinea and has played for that women's national team. She was part of the Equatorial Guinea squad at the 2011 FIFA Women's World Cup, making three appearances. At the club level she played for Estrellas de E'Waiso Ipola in Equatorial Guinea.

References

1995 births
Living people
Footballers from Douala
Cameroonian women's footballers
Women's association football midfielders
Cameroonian emigrants to Equatorial Guinea
Naturalized citizens of Equatorial Guinea
Equatoguinean women's footballers
Equatorial Guinea women's international footballers
2011 FIFA Women's World Cup players
Footballers at the 2010 Summer Youth Olympics